The 20th Saturn Awards, presented by the Academy of Science Fiction, Fantasy and Horror Films and honoring the best in science fiction, fantasy, and horror belonging to genre fiction in film, television and home video in 1993, were held on October 20, 1994.

Winners and nominees
Below is a complete list of nominees and winners. Winners are highlighted in bold.

Film

Television

Home video

Special awards
George Pal Memorial Award
 Wah Chang
 Gene Warren
 Stan Winston

Life Career Award
 Whit Bissell
 Steve Reeves

Posthumous Award
 Alfred Hitchcock

President's Award
 Steven Spielberg

Service Award
 Mardi Rustam

References

External links
 Official website
 Past Winners Database: 1993 20th Saturn Awards

1994 awards in the United States
1994 awards
1994 film awards
1994 television awards
Saturn Awards ceremonies